The Whistlers is a  mountain summit located in Jasper National Park, in the Trident Range of the Canadian Rockies of Alberta, Canada. The municipality of Jasper is situated 7 kilometres to the northeast. Its nearest higher peak is Indian Peak,  to the southwest. The highest and longest aerial tramway in Canada ascends to a lookout at 2,277 meters elevation, still 193 meters below the summit, but a hiking trail continues to the summit. Some of the mountains that can be seen (weather permitting) from the top include Mount Robson, Mount Bridgland, Monarch Mountain, Cairngorm, Pyramid Mountain, Hawk Mountain, Mount Colin, Grisette Mountain, Mount Tekarra, Mount Hardisty, Mount Kerkeslin, Marmot Mountain, Terminal Mountain, and Manx Peak.

History

The descriptive name The Whistlers was applied in 1916 by Édouard-Gaston Deville of the Geological Survey of Canada for the whistling inhabitants of the mountain, the hoary marmot. The mountain's name was officially adopted in 1951 by the Geographical Names Board of Canada.

Climate

Based on the Köppen climate classification, The Whistlers is located in a subarctic climate zone with cold, snowy winters, and mild summers. Temperatures can drop below -20 °C with wind chill factors below -30 °C. Precipitation runoff from The Whistlers drains into tributaries of the Athabasca River.

In popular culture 
On 9 April 2022, TikTok user Andrew Dawson posted a video what appears to be a massive giant standing near the top of Whistlers Peak Mountain. The video went viral, garnishing more than 2.8 million views. 

Following the initial video, Andrew continued to post a series of videos over the next few months detailing an alleged ongoing experience of being followed and observed by individuals whom he deemed were CIA operatives. 

On 6 May 2022, Andrew admitted the series of videos to be a hoax, however 10 days later on 16 May 2022 he posted a video with the captions reading "I'm scared" and "To much has happened and i can't be forced to be silent." in which he recanted his previous statement stating his videos were in fact real. By 17 May 2022, Andrew had posted his final video related to the events in which he recorded Whistlers Peak one last time with what appeared to be some sort of military unit on top. On 1 July 2022, an obituary was published for Andrew. No information can be found surrounding his death or his surviving family members.

See also

List of mountains of Canada

References

Gallery

Views from the top

External links
 Parks Canada web site: Jasper National Park
 Webcam and weather: Jasper Skytram

Two-thousanders of Alberta
Mountains of Jasper National Park
Canadian Rockies
Alberta's Rockies